The Atari Game Brain (model number: C-700) is an unreleased home video game console that was developed and planned for release by Atari in June 1978. It plays 10 particular games, converted from all of Atari's previously released dedicated consoles, such as Pong, Stunt Cycle, and Video Pinball. Its controllers are on the console face, with 4 directional buttons, a paddle, and a fire button. Games are inserted in the top of the system by opening a door that also bears a small instruction booklet.

The system was not intended as a big seller for Atari but rather as a clearance of CPUs from unsold dedicated consoles. By the time the Game Brain was finished, dedicated consoles were becoming obsolete against consoles with removable ROM cartridges, such as the already released Fairchild Channel F, the RCA Studio 2, and Atari's own Atari 2600. Atari canceled the Game Brain around 1978. Three Atari Game Brain consoles and five prototype cartridges are known to exist.

Games

Pong
Stunt Cycle
Super Pong
Super Pong ProAm
Super Pong ProAm 10
Super Pong 10
Ultra Pong
Ultra Pong Doubles
Video Music
Video Pinball

References

External links
 The Atari Museum's page about the Game Brain

Game brain
Vaporware game consoles